Breezeway Records is a small, independent record label based in Charlottesville, Virginia. Breezeway works with four artists and has released a total of six records.

List of albums
Soko – In November Sunlight (1996)
Tim Reynolds & Michael Sokolowski – Common Margins (1999)
Worth Proffitt, Tim Reynolds, Michael Sokolowski – Offering (2000)
Michael Sokolowski – Monday (2001)
Worth Proffitt, Tim Reynolds, Michael Sokolowski – Live Offering (2004)
Soko – Two (2005)

See also
 List of record labels

References

American independent record labels
Jazz record labels
Experimental music record labels
Companies based in Virginia